Kollu or Kelly is a very small village in the Dashkasan Rayon of Azerbaijan.  The village forms part of the municipality of Zinzahal.

References 

Populated places in Dashkasan District